Luis Emilio Blanco Coto (born 15 January 1990) is an Andorran footballer who plays as a midfielder for UE Engordany and the Andorra national team.

Career
Blanco made his international debut for Andorra on 6 September 2020 in the UEFA Nations League against the Faroe Islands, which finished as a 0–1 home loss.

Career statistics

International

References

External links
 
 
 
 

1990 births
Living people
Footballers from Barcelona
Andorran footballers
Andorra youth international footballers
Andorra under-21 international footballers
Andorra international footballers
Spanish footballers
Spanish people of Andorran descent
People with acquired Andorran citizenship
Association football midfielders
FC Andorra players
FC Santa Coloma players
UE Sant Julià players
Primera Divisió players